Admetophoneus is a dubious genus of non-mammalian synapsid from Russia. Its type and only species is Admetophoneus kargalensis.

History

Admetophoneus was named by the Russian paleontologist Ivan Efremov in 1954, based on some teeth, a fragmentary maxilla, and a humerus. It was originally classified as a member of Brithopodidae. Later, it was classified in Phthinosuchidae. Recent study, however, has shown that it is a member of Anteosauria, but lacks diagnostic features. It is essentially identical to the contemporaneous Titanophoneus, and could be synonymous with it, but its poor preservation means that it cannot be proven.

See also

 List of therapsids

References 

 The main groups of non-mammalian synapsids at Mikko's Phylogeny Archive

Anteosaurs
Prehistoric therapsid genera
Fossil taxa described in 1954
Taxa named by Ivan Yefremov